Guy Forget and Andrés Gómez were the defending champions, but Gómez did not participate this year.  Forget partnered Kevin Curren, losing in the semifinals.

Sherwood Stewart and Kim Warwick won the title, defeating Pat Cash and Slobodan Živojinović 6–4, 6–4 in the final.

Seeds

Draw

Finals

Top half

Bottom half

References
Draw

Stockholm Open
1986 Grand Prix (tennis)